William Corbet may refer to:

William Corbet (1779–1842), Irish soldier
William Corbet (MP) for Worcestershire (UK Parliament constituency)
William Corbet (MP fl.1318), MP for Gloucestershire (UK Parliament constituency)
Sir William Corbet, 5th Baronet (1702–1748), of the Corbet baronets
William John Corbet (born 1881), Guernsey born pilot and World War II hero
William Joseph Corbet (1824–1909), Irish nationalist politician and Member of Parliament

See also
William Corbett (disambiguation)
Corbet (surname)